Proletarskaya metro station may refer to:

Belarus
Proletarskaya (Minsk Metro), a station of the Minsk Metro, Minsk, Belarus

Russia
Proletarskaya (Moscow Metro), a station of the Moscow Metro, Moscow, Russia
Proletarskaya (Saint Petersburg Metro), a station of the Saint Petersburg Metro, Saint Petersburg, Russia
Proletarskaya (Nizhny Novgorod Metro), a station of the Nizhny Novgorod Metro, Nizhny Novgorod, Russia

Ukraine
Proletarska (Donetsk Metro) (Proletarskaya), a station of the Donetsk Metro, Donetsk, Ukraine
Proletarska (Kharkiv Metro) (Proletarskaya), a station of the Kharkiv Metro, Kharkiv, Ukraine